The 2022 Bethune–Cookman Wildcats football team represented Bethune–Cookman University as a member of the East Division of the Southwestern Athletic Conference (SWAC) during the 2022 NCAA Division I FCS football season. The Wildcats were led by seventh-year head coach Terry Sims and played their home games at Daytona Stadium in Daytona Beach, Florida.

Previous season

The Wildcats finished the 2021 season with a record of 2–9, 2–6 SWAC play to finish in last place in East Division.

Schedule

Game summaries

at No. 16 (FBS) Miami (FL)

South Carolina State

Grambling State

at Alabama A&M

at Tennessee State

No. 8т Jackson State

at Mississippi Valley State

at Prairie View A&M

Alabama State

at Alcorn State

vs. Florida A&M

References

Bethune-Cookman
Bethune–Cookman Wildcats football seasons
Bethune-Cookman Wildcats football